Hot Dog is a 1930 animated short film which is presented by Max Fleischer and was also directed by Dave Fleischer. The film, which was originally released by Paramount Pictures, is the first cartoon to feature Bimbo, as he attempts to gain a lover during the film.

The title is meant to show Bimbo's delight when he finds another girl, as 'Hot Dog' is North American exclamation slang for "An expression of delight".

Copyrighted on March 29, 1930, and released the same day, the film is part of the Talkartoons cartoon series, which was released by Paramount Pictures.

Plot

The film begins with Bimbo in his car. He then stops at a line of three girls, and in an attempt to charm them, tips his hat to them. This does not work on two of them, who both reject him. However, when the third one accepts and turns around, Bimbo comically realises that the third "girl" is a male lion. So, the car comically digs a hole in the road in order to escape him. Bimbo tips his hat to him as he leaves. The police officer notices this and start to pursue Bimbo. Whilst the police officer is doing that, Bimbo is attempting to charm another girl, by whistling at her and putting his arm around her. This ends in the flowers on the girl's hat comically turning into a fist and then striking Bimbo in the head. Bimbo then tries to kiss the girl, whilst calling her "his sweetheart". This ends with the girl's shoes turning into roller skates and she skates away from Bimbo. When he is trying to catch her, the police officer spots him, and tries to get him. Bimbo tries to walk away, but ends up in a police march. The band play "When Johnny Comes Marching Home" whilst going to the station. Bimbo then ends up in court. The judge asks him to explain his presence. Bimbo, then brings out his banjo, and starts to play "St. Louis Blues". The entire court starts to dance to the song, with the Liberty painting on the wall comically dancing as well. He then starts to sing. His testimony is recording as squatting, due to its presences in the song that he is singing. He then gets on the judge's desk and continues to scat and then he comically uses the judge's beard as a banjo, which angers the judge. He then bounces on his banjo and tips his hat to the entire court. The film ends with Bimbo comically leaving the court house riding his banjo like a unicycle.

Characters
In this film, there is a plethora of characters. One of them is Bimbo, who is the main character in the film. Bimbo tries multiple times to gain a lover, however he fails at doing so and ends up in court. There are also the police officers, who attempt to pursue him throughout the film. There are also the women, who Bimbo attempts to charm them throughout the film. The film features both humans and animals, as the court room is entire consisted all humans, whilst the streets are all animal.

Reception 
Hot Dog was well received by the cinema magazine Variety. The magazine said that the film was "Quite a laugh", and also said that the film possesses a "real hot quality".

References

External links 

1930 films
1930 short films
1930s American animated films
1930s animated short films
1930 animated films